Kharabeh-ye Sadat (also Romanized as Kharābeh-ye Sādāt) is a village in Saidiyeh Rural District, Bostan District, Dasht-e Azadegan County, Khuzestan Province, Iran. At the 2006 census, its population was 59, in 9 families.

References 

Populated places in Dasht-e Azadegan County